Tree hugger may refer to:
 A slang term, sometimes derogatory, for environmentalists
 Chipko movement, an environmental movement in India
 TreeHugger, a sustainability website
 The Tree Hugger Project, an environmental art project